The Minack Theatre is an open-air theatre, constructed above a gully with a rocky granite outcrop jutting into the sea. The theatre is at Porthcurno,  from Land's End in Cornwall, England. The season runs each year from May to September. , some 80,000 people a year see a show, and more than 100,000 pay an entrance fee to look around the site. It has appeared in a listing of the world's most spectacular theatres.

The theatre was the brainchild of Rowena Cade, who moved to Cornwall after the First World War and built a house for herself and her mother on land at Minack Point for £100. Her sister was the feminist dystopian author Katharine Burdekin , and her partner lived with them from the 1920s. In 1929, a local village group of players had staged Shakespeare's A Midsummer Night's Dream in a nearby meadow at Crean, repeating the production the next year. They decided that their next production would be The Tempest and Cade offered the garden of her house as a suitable location, as it was beside the sea. Cade and her gardener, Billy Rawlings, made a terrace and rough seating, hauling materials down from the house or up via the winding path from the beach below. In 1932, The Tempest was performed with the sea as a dramatic backdrop, to great success. Cade resolved to improve the theatre, working over the course of the winter months each year throughout her life (with the help of Rawlings and Charles Angove), so that others might perform each summer.

In 1944, the theatre was used as a location for the Gainsborough Studios film Love Story, starring Stewart Granger and Margaret Lockwood but inclement weather forced them to retreat to a studio mock-up. In 1955, the first dressing rooms were built. In the 1970s, the theatre was managed by Lawrence Shove. Since 1976 the theatre has been registered as a charitable trust and is now run by a local management team. Rowena Cade died on 26 March 1983, at the age of 89.

The Minack currently is used from Easter to September for a full summer season of 20 plays, produced by companies from all over the UK and visiting companies from the US. The theatre is open for visitors throughout the rest of the year. The 75th anniversary of the Minack was celebrated with a production of The Tempest in August 2007, directed by Simon Taylor and performed by the Winchester College Players.

References

External links

Official website with pictures and full history
BBC tribute to the 30th anniversary of the death of Rowena Cade
Daily Telegraph article by Philip Johnston about history of theatre

Penwith
Theatres in Cornwall
1932 establishments in England